ZAP Viva is one of the paid channels belonging to the Angolan company ZAP, transmitted from this December 24, 2012, broadcast 24 hours a day and its programming is based on entertainment productions such as soap operas, television series, variety show, talent, reality and talk shows. The channel is broadcast in Angola and Mozambique, through the satellite television operator ZAP. Its HD broadcast began on October 1, 2017 at position 5 of ZAP. In Portugal, the channel arrived at satellite television operator NOS on May 11, 2019. It is available in the basic package.

At the 19th annual Eutelsat TV Awards (which distinguish excellence and innovation in the broadcasting of television content), the channel won the category "Best Entertainment/Fiction Channel". The winners were announced in Milan, Italy with the participation of more than 350 broadcast industry executives from around the world, where a ZAP delegation came to receive the prize.

References

External links
 Official website in Angola
 Official website in Mozambique

Television channels and stations established in 2012
Television channels in Angola
Television channels in Mozambique
Portuguese-language television networks